The 2019 Alamo Bowl was a college football bowl game played on December 31, 2019, with kickoff at 7:30 p.m. EST (6:30 p.m. local CST) on ESPN. It was the 27th edition of the Alamo Bowl, and was one of the 2019–20 bowl games concluding the 2019 FBS football season. Sponsored by Valero Energy, the game was officially known as the Valero Alamo Bowl.

Teams
The game was played between the Utah Utes of the Pac-12 Conference and the Texas Longhorns of the Big 12 Conference. This was second time that the two programs have met; their prior meeting was in 1982, won by Texas.

Utah Utes

Utah entered the game with an 11–2 record (8–1 in conference), and ranked 12th in the AP Poll. They finished the regular season atop the Pac-12's South Division, having only lost to USC. In the Pac-12 Championship Game, the Utes faced Oregon and were defeated, 37–15. Utah was 1–1 against ranked opponents, defeating Arizona State and losing to Oregon. This was the first appearance for the Utes in the Alamo Bowl.

Texas Longhorns

Texas entered the game with a 7–5 record (5–4 in conference). They finished in a four-way tie for third place in the Big 12. The Longhorns were 1–3 against ranked opponents; losing to LSU, Oklahoma, and Baylor while defeating Kansas State. This was Texas' fourth Alamo Bowl, tying the Longhorns with Iowa and Oklahoma State for the most appearances. Texas entered the game with a 2–1 record in prior Alamo Bowl appearances.

Game summary

Statistics

Notes

References

External links

Game statistics at statbroadcast.com

Alamo Bowl
Alamo Bowl
Alamo Bowl
Alamo Bowl
Utah Utes football bowl games
Texas Longhorns football bowl games